The P-15 Termit is an anti-ship missile developed by the Soviet Union's Raduga design bureau in the 1950s. Its GRAU designation was 4K40, its NATO reporting name was Styx or SS-N-2.  China acquired the design in 1958 and created at least four versions: the CSS-N-1 Scrubbrush and CSS-N-2 versions were developed for ship-launched operation, while the CSS-C-2 Silkworm and CSS-C-3 Seersucker were used for coastal defence. Other names for this basic type of missile include: HY-1, SY-1, and FL-1 Flying Dragon (Chinese designations typically differ for export and domestic use, even for otherwise identical equipment), North Korean local produced KN-1 or KN-01, derived from both Silkworm variants and Russian & USSR P-15, Rubezh, P-20 P-22 .

Despite its large size, thousands of P-15s were built and installed on many classes of ships from torpedo boats to destroyers, and coastal batteries and bomber aircraft (Chinese versions).

Origins
The P-15 was not the first anti-ship missile in Soviet service; that distinction goes to the SS-N-1 Scrubber, and to the aircraft-launched AS-1 Kennel. The SS-N-1 was a powerful but rather raw system, and it was soon superseded by the SS-N-3 Shaddock. This weapon was  fitted to 4,000-ton Kynda class cruisers and replaced an initial plan for 30,000-ton battlecruisers armed with 305mm and 45mm guns. Rather than rely on a few heavy and costly ships, a new weapons system was designed to fit smaller, more numerous vessels, while maintaining sufficient striking power. The P-15 was developed by the Soviet designer Beresyniak, who helped in the development of the BI rocket interceptor.

Design

The first variant was the P-15, with fixed wings. The basic design of the missile, retained for all subsequent versions, featured a cylindrical body, a rounded nose, two delta wings in the center and three control surfaces in the tail. It was also fitted with a solid-fueled booster under the belly. This design was based on the Yak-1000 experimental fighter built in 1951.

The weapon was meant to be cheap, yet still give an ordinary missile boat the same 'punch' as a battleship salvo. The onboard electronics were based on a simple analog design, with a homing conical scanning radar sensor. It used a more reliable rocket engine with acid fuel in preference to a turbojet.

Some shortcomings were never totally solved, due to the liquid propellant of the rocket engine: the acid fuel gradually corroded the missile fuselage.

The explosive warhead was behind the fuel tank, and as the missile retained a large amount of unburned fuel at the time of impact, even at maximum range, it acted as an incendiary device.

The warhead was a  shaped charge, an enlarged version of a high-explosive anti-tank (HEAT) warhead, larger than the semi-armour piercing (SAP) warhead typical of anti-ship missiles. The launch was usually made with the help of electronic warfare support measures (ESM) gear and Garpun radar at a range of between  due to the limits of the targeting system.

The P-15U was introduced in 1965, with improved avionics and folding wings, enabling the use of smaller containers. It was replaced by the P-15M in 1972, which was a further development of the P-15U, with enhanced abilities (its export simplified variants were designated P-21 and P-22, depending on the sensor installed, and a whole export system was designated the P-20M).

Versions

Russia
In total, the P-15 family had the following models:
P-15: A basic (SS-N-2A) with I-band, a conical search sensor and 40 km range.
P-15M: (SS-N-2C), heavier and longer than the P-15, it had a range of 80 km and several minor improvements.
P-15MC: Essentially a P-15M, coupled with a Bulgarian-made electronic countermeasure package for that country's navy.
P-20: A P-15 updated with the new guidance system  but with the original shorter range. They were perhaps known as SS-N2 B and used by Komar and Osa class boats.
P-20K: A P-15M with a new guidance system.
P-20M: A surface version of the P-20L with folding wings. This was the definitive version of the P-15M with radar guidance.
P-22 other development of or along P-20 ; other variants P-21, P-27
4K51 Rubezh and 4K40, SS-N-2 2c SSC-3 Styx, using P-20 and P-22, Self-propelled missile

People's Republic of China

The Chinese used this missile as a basis for their Silkworm series, with infrared (IR), radar,  and turbojets or rocket engines depending on the model. The mass is over 2 tonnes. Chinese Silkworm missiles were used in hundreds of ships and shore batteries. The Chinese Navy built more than two hundred modified versions of the 183R (Komar-class), the Hegu-class, (complete with a longer hull and an added 25mm mount aft) and the Osa-class. Frigates and destroyers were also equipped with the missile. Some were exported and they were used in shore batteries built for North Korea, Iraq and Iran. The Soviet Union developed an equivalent, the P-120 Malakhit.

 (C.201) (SY is the abbreviation of pinyin: Shàng Yóu, literal meaning is upper river): The original Chinese copy of P-15 as ship-to-ship missile, called as Project 544, designed and assembled by Nanchang Aerocraft Factory from 1960, first inland test flight in December 1964 and ship-mounted test-fired in August 1965, finished the research tests in June 1966, began definitizing test from Nov 1966, permitted definitize on August 1967. It entered service during 1968 in missile boats and destroyers and later coastal batteries. Dimensions were:  (length), 0.76m (diameter), 2.4m (wingspan). This unit employed conical scanning and was vulnerable to electronic counter measures (ECM), due to its slow onboard computer. The SY-1A entered service after 1984, with a monopulse surface-search radar comparable to the evolution of the AIM-7, F to M model.
SY-2: An improved version developed from 1976. Used the solid rocket engine and supersonics flight, smaller and lighter than SY-1, extended range to 50 km. The exported version is FL-2.

 (C.201) (HY is the abbreviation of pinyin:Hǎi Yīng, literal meaning is Sea Eagle): It was the equivalent of the P-15M, and was known as the C-SS-3 Saccade. Designed for coastal batteries, with a larger airframe, its dimensions were: 7.48m × 0.76m × 2.4m, weight . extended range from the SY-1's . Trials were carried out from 1967 to 1970 with 10 missiles out of 11 hitting the target. It entered service in China and was also exported. There were several versions:
HY-2: Basic, inertial and conical radar search (improved to SY-1), 1970.
HY-2A: IR-guidance variant. Developed during the 1970s and in 1980, it did not enter service despite certification in 1982. It was the equivalent of the P-22.
HY-2A-II: An improved variant of the HY-2A with an improved IR sensor, it entered service in 1988. It was also available for export.
: Fitted with monopulse-search radar to improve accuracy and reliability, it was test-fired, scoring five hits out of six and entered service two years later in 1984. The YB-2B-II had another radar search system, entering service in 1989. These two missiles could fly at an altitude of 20–50m, so the overall abilities (altitude, range, reliability, electronic counter counter measures (ECCM)) were greatly superior.
: Fitted with a turbojet engine instead of a liquid rocket version. It was only used for export, it had a 150 km range. It is arguably also called HY-4 or C-SS-N-7 Sadpack, its dimensions are similar to the HY-1 and HY-2, but its weight is only , demonstrating the differences between turbojet and rocket propulsion systems. It is not known if this model entered service.

Substitutes of these missiles are the FL-2 and FL-7, which were solid-rocket fuelled and the C-701 and C-801, which were similar to the Exocet and other missile systems, among them the SS-N-22 Sunburn, it was bought for Sovremenny class destroyers.

North Korea
KN-1 or KN-01 locally produced Geum Seong-1 Korean 금성-1호, derived from both Silkworm and Russian P-15 Termit, Rubezh, P-20 P-22 .

Launch platforms
This missile, despite its mass, was used in small and medium ships, from 60 to 4,000 tons, shore batteries and (only for derived models) aircraft and submarines. The main users were:
Komar-class missile boats
Osa-class missile boats
Tarantul-class corvettes
Nanuchka-class corvettes
Koni-class frigates
Kotor-class frigates
The frigate Mărășești
Kildin-class destroyers
Kashin-class destroyers

Operational usage

Cuban Missile Crisis
The first use of these weapons was in 1962, during the Cuban Missile Crisis. Komar-class missile boats were deployed in Operation "Anadyr" ("Анадырь"), organized by the Soviet Union to help the Castro government. At least eight were sent in cargo ships, due partly to their small dimensions and were presumably left to the Cuban Navy after the crisis, together with many other weapons of Soviet origin.

War of Attrition
During the War of Attrition, after the Six-Day War in 1967, the Israeli destroyer Eilat was sailing at low speed outside Port Said on 21 October. Eilat was hit, despite defensive anti-aircraft fire. The first two missiles almost blew the Eilat in two; another hit soon after, and the last exploded near the wreck in the sea. Eilat sank two hours after the first attack. 47 crew were killed. After this engagement, interest in this type of weapon was raised in both offensive weapons and defensive weapons such as close-in weapon systems (CIWS) and electronic countermeasures (ECM).

Indo-Pakistani War

During the Indo-Pakistani War of 1971, Indian Osa-class boats raided the port of Karachi in two highly successful operations causing severe damage and sinking several ships with their P-15s, among them the destroyer, Khaibar. She was a former Battle-class destroyer, originally designed as an anti-aircraft ship. Her armament might be effective against conventional air threats, (mounting 5 × 114mm guns and several 40mm Bofors), but had little chance against anti-ship missiles.

These raids were meant to strike Karachi and destroy the Pakistani Navy in Western Pakistan. The first action, Operation Trident, was carried out by three Osa class missile boats on the night of 5 December. 'Operation Trident' involved:
INS Nipat (Lt.-Cdr B.N Kavina, Vir Chakra (VrC))
INS Nirghat (Lt.-Cdr I.J Sharma, Ati Vishisht Seva Medal (AVSM), VrC)
INS Veer (Lt.-Cdr O.P Mehta, VrC, NM)

The crew of the ship saw a "bright light" in the sky, low on the water. Believing it to be the afterburner of a fighter aircraft, Khaibar opened fire with her Bofors guns, but these were not effective against such a small, fast target. The missile struck the starboard side at 22:45, destroying the electrical system. One of the boilers, possibly struck by the HEAT charge, also exploded. Despite thick smoke and a fire, Khaibar was still able to engage the second missile, again mistaking it for an enemy fighter. This missile struck the ship four minutes after the first, destroying and quickly sinking her.

During this action, Nipat attacked another two ships; the cargo vessel Venus Challenger, which was carrying ammunition from Saigon, was destroyed. Her escort, the destroyer PNS Shahjahan was severely damaged and later scrapped.

Veer then attacked Muhafiz at 23:05, (she was a minesweeper that had witnessed the attacks against Khaibar); she was hit and disintegrated, throwing most of the crew into the water before she sank.

Nipat fired two missiles at the port of Karachi. This is the first known use of an anti-ship missile against land targets. Large oil tanks, identified by radar, were hit by the first missile, destroying it, while the second weapon failed. Over the following nights there were other ship actions. Karachi was again attacked with missiles, while Petya-class frigates provided anti-submarine protection to the Osa-class boats.

On the night of 8 December, in the second operation, Operation Python, the Osa-class boat Vinash, escorted by two frigates, fired missiles at Karachi in a six-minute action. One missile hit an oil tank, destroying it. The British ship Harmattan was sunk, the Panamanian ship Gulfstar was set on fire. The Pakistan Navy fleet tanker, PNS Dacca, was badly damaged and only survived because the commanding officer, Captain. S.Q. Raza S.J. P.N., ordered the release of steam in the pipes that prevented the fire reaching the tanks. Though anti-aircraft guns opened fire in response, they only managed to hit a Greek ship, Zoë, that was moored in the port and consequently sank.

In all these actions against large ships, the P-15 proved to be an effective weapon, with a devastating warhead. Out of eleven missiles fired, only one malfunctioned, giving a 91% success rate. This gave every Osa FAC the possibility of striking several targets. Big ships, without any specialized defence, were targets for P-15s.

United States
CIA inspected and analyzed data on Styx missiles from the guidance systems of missiles delivered to Indonesia. The US Navy had underestimated the threat of Soviet missiles, but after 1967 this changed. The US Navy thought that North Vietnam missile boats and coastal defenses using P-15 missiles could be met by US vessels off the coast and that ECM and air defense missiles would be effective countermeasures. The Soviet Union in fact decided not to supply P-15 missiles to North Vietnam, even though a promise to do so had been made in 1965.

In April 1972 the US Navy claimed to have been attacked by P-15 missiles and they were shot down by Terrier Missiles.

Yom Kippur War
Despite these early successes, the 1973 Yom Kippur War saw P-15 missiles used by the Egyptian and Syrian navies prove ineffective against Israeli ships. The Israeli Navy had phased out their old ships, building a fleet of Sa'ar-class FACs: faster, smaller, more maneuverable and equipped with new missiles and countermeasures.

Although the range of the P-15 was twice that of the Israeli Gabriel, allowing Arab ships to fire first, radar jamming and chaff degraded their accuracy. In the Battle of Latakia and Battle of Baltim, several dozen P-15s were fired and all missed. Arab ships did not possess heavy firepower required for surface combat against enemy vessels, usually only 25 and 30mm guns, and Osa and Komar boats were not always able to outrun their Israeli pursuers.

Iran–Iraq War
P-15 variants, including the Chinese duplication "Silkworm", were employed by Iran against Iraq in the 1980–1988 Iran–Iraq War, with some success. As the Iranian coastline is longer than Iraq's, control of the Persian Gulf was relatively easy.  Shore batteries with missiles can control a large part of this area, especially around the Hormuz Strait.

Iraq also acquired Silkworms, some with an IR homing ability. Iraqi OSA-class missile boats equipped with SS-N-2 used them against the IRIN navy, managed to hit and sink an Iranian La Combattante IIa-class fast attack craft, but sustained heavy losses, especially from Iranian Harpoons and Mavericks. Iraqi forces combined SS-N-2 (P-15 Termit) launched from Tu-22, Exocet missiles launched from Mirage F1 and Super Etendard, as well as Silkworm missiles and C-601 missiles launched from Tu-16 and H-6 bombers, bought from the Soviet Union and China to engage the Iranian Navy and tankers carrying Iranian oil.

Gulf War (1990-1991)

During the First Gulf War an Iraqi missile crew attacked US battleship  with a Silkworm, while it was escorting a fleet of minesweepers engaged in coastal anti-mine operations. HMS Gloucester engaged the missile with a salvo shot of Sea Dart missiles which destroyed it after it had flown over its initial target.

Operators

The P-15 missile family and their clones were widely deployed from the 1960s. They were big and powerful weapons, but quite cheap and so made in the thousands. It is difficult even to list all the operators.

The German Navy, after reunification, gave its stock of almost 200 P-15s to the United States Navy in 1991, these weapons being mainly the P-15M/P-22. They were used for missile defence tests.

Current operators

Algerian National Navy
Angolan Navy
Azerbaijan Navy
Bulgarian Navy – P-15MC
Cuban Navy
Cameroon Navy
Egyptian Navy
Indian Navy
Indonesian Navy
Iranian Navy
Libyan Navy
Moroccan Navy
Korean People's Navy
People's Liberation Army Navy
Romanian Navy
Russian Navy
Somalian Navy
Sri Lankan Navy
Syrian Arab Navy
Vietnam People's Navy
Yemeni Navy

Former operators

Bangladeshi Navy, retired from service.
Finnish Navy, retired from service.
East German Navy, passed on to Germany.
German Navy, acquired from East Germany after the German reunification and withdrawn from service shortly thereafter.
Georgian Navy, several dozen missiles Delivered from Ukraine, Out of service.
Iraqi Navy, acquired during the 1970s through 1980s, phased out. 
Polish Navy, withdrawn from combat service, 31 March 2006. They are currently used as target drones for anti-aircraft training.
Soviet Navy
SFR Yugoslav Navy

Captured-only operators
US Navy, for experimental activities.

References
Notes

Bibliography

Slade, Stuart, The true history of Soviet anti-ship missiles, Rivista Italiana Difesa magazine May 1994.
Shikavthecenko, V, 'Lightings in the sea: the Russian FACs developments' RID September 1995.
SY-1 missile
C.201 missile

External links

P-015
P-015
Surface-to-surface missiles
MKB Raduga products